North Carolina Highway 89 (NC 89) is a  primary state highway in the U.S. state North Carolina including Mount Airy and Danbury. The entire route spans only two counties in the state: Surry and Stokes. It can be accessed from the Blue Ridge Parkway via Virginia's State Route 89 (the highway that continues from NC 89's western terminus) or an interchange with NC 18 which intersects NC 89 near its western terminus. Interstates 74 and 77 both intersect NC 89 west of Mount Airy.

Route description
NC 89 begins as a continuation of Virginia State Route 89 (SR 89) at the state line and heads south. It intersects NC 18's eastern terminus before making a U-turn to the north and then continuing southeast. The route passes through Lowgap and Beulah before interchanging at the junctions with Interstate 77 and Interstate 74. It then continues east and enters Mt. Airy, interchanging US 52 as West Independence Boulevard. NC 89 then continues east on Westfield Road, passing through Sheltontown, Woodville, and Westfield before intersecting the northern terminus of NC 66 in Johnstown. The route then continues to the northeast and then intersecting the western terminus of NC 704 in Francisco before heading southeast. It then intersects the eastern terminus of NC 268 before crossing the Dan River and then becoming concurrent with NC 8, passing through Danbury. As it enters town, it reaches its eastern terminus at US 311 while the road continues south carrying the US 311 designation through downtown.

History
NC 89 is an original North Carolina state highway, established in 1921 by the North Carolina State Highway Commission. The highway began at NC 80 in Mount Airy and ran east to Francisco where it intersected NC 661. The highway then turned southeast, travelled through Danbury and Walnut Cove, before ending at NC 897 in Walkertown. At the time of establishment, NC 89 travelled through three counties, Surry County, Stokes County, and Forsyth County. By 1924, much of the route was considered a topsoil, sand-clay, and gravel road. Two exceptions existed, a segment north of Danbury, which was unimproved, and the segment in Forsyth County, which was paved. By 1926, NC 89 was removed from its routing between Walnut Cove and Walkertown, eliminating the highway in Forsyth County. The former routing became part of an extended NC 77. NC 89 was paved between its western terminus at NC 80 and NC 66 near Mount Airy, and between NC 891 near Danbury and NC 77 in Walnut Cove. The formerly unimproved section of road northwest of Danbury was upgraded to a topsoil, sand-clay, and gravel road by 1926 as well. Between 1929 and 1930, NC 89 was extended west to the Virginia state line. The highway was routed west of Mount Airy through Low Gap before ending at Virginia State Route 117 (SR 117) at the state line which continued toward Galax. 

On May 31, 1962, NC 89 was placed onto split streets in Mount Airy. Whereas the road had previously used South Main Street for both traffic directions, the northbound lanes were placed onto Cherry Street, Renfro Street, and Pine Street. The southbound lanes of NC 89 continued to use South Main Street. All lanes of traffic were moved onto Renfro Street and Pine Street on October 1, 1970. The most recent change to the routing of NC 89 occurred on June 27, 1997 when the North Carolina Department of Transportation (NCDOT) removed the highway from Pine Street between Independence Boulevard and Renfro Street. Instead, NC 89 was rerouted to follow Independence Boulevard east to Renfro Street and then follow Renfro Street through downtown Mount Airy.

Major intersections

See also
 North Carolina Bicycle Route 4

References

External links

 
 NCRoads.com: N.C. 89

089
Transportation in Surry County, North Carolina
Transportation in Stokes County, North Carolina